Global health is the health of the populations in the worldwide context; it has been defined as "the area of study, research, and practice that places a priority on improving health and achieving equity in health for all people worldwide". Problems that transcend national borders or have a global political and economic impact are often emphasized. Thus, global health is about worldwide health improvement (including mental health), reduction of disparities, and protection against global threats that disregard national borders, including the most common causes of human death and years of life lost from a global perspective.

Global health is not to be confused with international health, which is defined as the branch of public health focusing on developing nations and foreign aid efforts by industrialized countries.

One way global health can be measured is through the prevalence of various global diseases in the world and their threat to decrease life expectancy in the present day. Estimates suggest that in a pre-modern, poor world, life expectancy was around 30 years in all regions of the world (mainly due to high infant mortality). Another holistic perspective called One Health can be used to address global health challenges and to improve global health security.

The predominant agency associated with global health (and international health) is the World Health Organization (WHO). Other important agencies impacting global health include UNICEF and World Food Programme (WFP). The United Nations system has also played a part in cross-sectoral actions to address global health and its underlying socioeconomic determinants with the declaration of the Millennium Development Goals and the more recent Sustainable Development Goals.

Definition

Global health employs several perspectives that focus on the determinants and distribution of health in international contexts.

 Medicine describes the pathology of diseases and promotes prevention, diagnosis, and treatment.
 Public health emphasizes the health of populations.
 Epidemiology helps identify risk factors and causes of health problems.
 Demography provides data for policy decisions.<
 Economics emphasizes the cost-effectiveness and cost-benefit approaches for the optimal allocation of health resources.
 Other social sciences such as sociology, development studies, psychology, anthropology, cultural studies, and law can help understand the determinants of health in societies.

Both individuals and organizations working in the domain of global health often face many questions regarding ethical and human rights. Critical examination of the various causes and justifications of health inequities is necessary for the success of proposed solutions. Such issues are discussed at the bi-annual Global Summits of National Ethics/Bioethics Councils.

History

Global health as a discipline is widely acknwoledged to be of imperial origin and the need for its decolonisation has been widely recognised. The global health ecosystem has also been criticised as having a feudal structure, acting for a small group of institutions and individuals based in high-income countries which acts similar to an imperial "Crown".. 

Important steps were taken towards global co-operation in health with the formation of the United Nations (UN) and the World Bank Group in 1945, after World War II. In 1948, the member states of the newly formed United Nations gathered to create the World Health Organization. A cholera epidemic that took 20,000 lives in Egypt in 1947 and 1948 helped spur the international community to action. The WHO published its Model List of Essential Medicines, and the 1978 Alma Ata declaration underlined the importance of primary health care.

At a United Nations Summit in 2000, member nations declared eight Millennium Development Goals (MDGs), which reflected the major challenges facing human development globally, to be achieved by 2015. The declaration was matched by unprecedented global investment by donor and recipient countries. According to the UN, these MDGs provided an important framework for development and significant progress has been made in a number of areas.  However, progress has been uneven and some of the MDGs were not fully realized including maternal, newborn and child health and reproductive health. Building on the MDGs, a new Sustainable Development Agenda with 17 Sustainable Development Goals (SDGs) has been established for the years 2016–2030.  The first goal being an ambitious and historic pledge to end poverty. On 25 September 2015, the 193 countries of the UN General Assembly adopted the 2030 Development Agenda titled Transforming our world: the 2030 Agenda for Sustainable Development.

Several major initiatives began in the 2000s, including the vaccine alliance GAVI in 2000, The Global Fund to Fight AIDS, Tuberculosis and Malaria in 2002, U.S. President's Emergency Plan for AIDS Relief in 2003, the U.S. President's Malaria Initiative in 2005. In this decade and as part of the Monterrey Consensus (which didn't pursue goals as aggressively as many activists had urged), an increasing emphasis was put on measuring improvement in health outcomes, rather than merely the amount of money spent.

In 2015 a book titled "To Save Humanity" was published, with nearly 100 essays regarding today's most pressing global health issues. The essays were authored by global figures in politics, science, and advocacy ranging from Bill Clinton to Peter Piot, and addressed a wide range of issues including vaccinations, antimicrobial resistance, health coverage, tobacco use, research methodology, climate change, equity, access to medicine, and media coverage of health research.

Measures
Measures of global health include disability-adjusted life year (DALY), quality-adjusted life years (QALYs), and mortality rate.

Disability-adjusted life years

The DALY is a summary measure that combines the impact of illness, disability, and mortality by measuring the time lived with disability and the time lost due to premature mortality. One DALY can be thought of as one lost year of "healthy" life. The DALY for a disease is the sum of the years of life lost due to premature mortality and the years lost due to disability for incident cases of the health condition.

Quality-adjusted life years

QALYs combine expected survival with expected quality of life into a single number: if an additional year of healthy life is worth a value of one (year), then a year of less healthy life is worth less than one (year). QALY calculations are based on measurements of the value that individuals place on expected years of survival. Measurements can be made in several ways: by techniques that replicate gambles about preferences for alternative states of health, with surveys or analyses that infer willingness to pay for alternative states of health, or through instruments that are based on trading off some or all likely survival time that a medical intervention might provide in order to gain less survival time of higher quality.

Infant and child mortality

Infant mortality and child mortality for children under age 5 are more specific than DALYs or QALYs in representing the health in the poorest sections of a population, and are thus especially useful when focusing on health equity. added section

Morbidity

Morbidity measures include incidence rate, prevalence, and cumulative incidence, with incidence rate referring to the risk of developing a new health condition within a specified period of time. Although sometimes loosely expressed simply as the number of new cases during a time period, morbidity is better expressed as a proportion or a rate.

Health topics

Infectious diseases

Respiratory tract infections 

Infections of the respiratory tract and middle ear are major causes of morbidity and mortality worldwide. Some respiratory infections of global significance include tuberculosis, measles, influenza, coronaviruses and pneumonias caused by Mycobacterium tuberculosis, Morbillivirus, Haemophilus influenzae and Pneumococci respectively. The spread of respiratory infections is exacerbated by crowded conditions, and poverty is associated with more than a 20-fold increase in the relative burden of lung infections.

Diarrheal illnesses 

Diarrhea is the second most common cause of child mortality worldwide, responsible for 17% of deaths of children under age 5. Poor sanitation can increase transmission of bacteria and viruses through water, food, utensils, hands, and flies. Dehydration due to diarrhea can be effectively treated through oral rehydration therapy with dramatic reductions in mortality. Important nutritional measures include the promotion of breastfeeding and zinc supplementation. While hygienic measures alone may be insufficient for the prevention of rotavirus diarrhea, it can be prevented by a safe and potentially cost-effective vaccine.

HIV/AIDS 

The HIV/AIDS epidemic has highlighted the global nature of human health and welfare and globalization has given rise to a trend toward finding common solutions to global health challenges. Numerous international funds have been set up in recent times to address global health challenges such as HIV. Since the beginning of the epidemic, more than 70 million people have been infected with the HIV virus and about 35 million people have died of HIV. Globally, 36.9 million [31.1–43.9 million] people were living with HIV at the end of 2017. An estimated 0.8% [0.6–0.9%] of adults aged 15–49 years worldwide are living with HIV, although the burden of the epidemic continues to vary considerably between countries and regions. The WHO African region remains most severely affected, with nearly 1 in every 25 adults (4.1%) living with HIV and accounting for nearly two-thirds of the people living with HIV worldwide. Human immunodeficiency virus (HIV) is transmitted through unprotected sex, unclean needles, blood transfusions, and from mother to child during birth or lactation. Globally, HIV is primarily spread through sexual intercourse. The risk-per-exposure with vaginal sex in low-income countries from female to male is 0.38% and male to female is 0.3%. The infection damages the immune system, leading to acquired immunodeficiency syndrome (AIDS) and eventually, death. Antiretroviral drugs prolong life and delay the onset of AIDS by minimizing the amount of HIV in the body.

Malaria 

Malaria is a mosquito-borne infectious disease caused by the parasites of the genus Plasmodium. Symptoms may include fever, headaches, chills, muscle aches and nausea. Each year, there are approximately 500 million cases of malaria worldwide, most commonly among children and pregnant women in developing countries. The WHO African Region carries a disproportionately high share of the global malaria burden. In 2016, the region was home to 90% of malaria cases and 91% of malaria deaths. The use of insecticide-treated bed nets is a cost-effective way to reduce deaths from malaria, as is prompt artemisinin-based combination therapy, supported by intermittent preventive therapy in pregnancy. International travelers to endemic zones are advised chemoprophylaxis with antimalarial drugs like Atovaquone-proguanil, doxycycline, or mefloquine. Global consumption and international trade in deforestation-associated commodities could also indirectly influence malaria risk. Many primary commodities cause deforestation and deforestation can increase malaria transmission. Consumption of such commodities in developed nations could increase malaria risk in developing nations.

Bacterial pathogens 

A GBD study reported global estimates of death rates from (33) bacterial pathogens, finding such infections are contributing to one in 8 deaths (or ~7.7 million deaths), which  the second largest cause of death globally in 2019.

Neglected tropical diseases 

More than one billion people were treated for at least one neglected tropical disease in 2015. For instance, neglected tropical diseases are a diverse group of infectious diseases that are endemic in tropical and subtropical regions of 149 countries, primarily effecting low and middle income populations in Africa, Asia, and Latin America. They are variously caused by bacteria (Trachoma, Leprosy), viruses (Dengue, Rabies), protozoa (Human African trypanosomiasis, Chagas), and helminths (Schistosomiasis, Onchocerciasis, Soil transmitted helminths). The Global Burden of Disease Study concluded that neglected tropical diseases comprehensively contributed to approximately 26.06 million disability-adjusted life years in 2010, as well as significant deleterious economic effects. In 2011, the World Health Organization launched a 2020 Roadmap for neglected tropical diseases, aiming for the control or elimination of 10 common diseases. The 2012 London Declaration builds on this initiative, and called on endemic countries and the international community to improve access to clean water and basic sanitation, improved living conditions, vector control, and health education, to reach the 2020 goals. In 2017, a WHO report cited 'unprecedented progress' against neglected tropical diseases since 2007, especially due to mass drug administration of drugs donated by pharmaceutical companies.

Pandemic prevention and preparedness 
Pandemics have an impact on global health.

Health research and development

The global health approach could foster international collaboration in medical research and development and sharing of its results such as vaccines, optimizing for health. For example, there are calls for patent waivers of certain vaccines. Financing models, creation of evidence-based recommendations and logistics may be part of that. Vaccines' access and public-private partnerships are important. Often the relevance of mechanisms to stimulate research and development is limited by national scopes and "by the transnational nature of the problem which ask for an international approach".

Maternal health

Complications of pregnancy and childbirth are the leading causes of death among women of reproductive age. In many developing countries, a woman dies from complications from childbirth approximately every minute. According to the World Health Organization's 2005 World Health Report, poor maternal conditions are the fourth leading cause of death for women worldwide, after HIV/AIDS, malaria, and tuberculosis. Most maternal deaths and injuries can be prevented, and such deaths have been largely eradicated in the developed world. Targets for improving maternal health include increasing and assisting the number of deliveries accompanied by skilled birth attendants. 68 low-income countries tracked by the WHO- and UNICEF-led collaboration Countdown to 2015 are estimated to hold for 97% of worldwide maternal and child deaths.

Nutrition

In 2010, about 104 million children were underweight, and undernutrition contributes to about one third of child deaths around the world. (Undernutrition is not to be confused with malnutrition, which refers to poor proportion of food intake and can thus refer to obesity.) Undernutrition impairs the immune system, increasing the frequency, severity, and duration of infections (including measles, pneumonia, and diarrhea). Infection can further contribute to malnutrition.

Deficiencies of micronutrients, such as vitamin A, iron, iodine, and zinc, are common worldwide and can compromise intellectual potential, growth, development, and adult productivity. Interventions to prevent malnutrition include micronutrient supplementation, fortification of basic grocery foods, dietary diversification, hygienic measures to reduce spread of infections, and the promotion of breastfeeding.

Non-communicable diseases 

Approximately 80% of deaths linked to non-communicable diseases occur in developing countries. For instance, urbanization and aging have led to increasing poor health conditions related to non-communicable diseases in India. The fastest-growing causes of disease burden over the last 26 years were diabetes (rate increased by 80%) and ischemic heart disease (up 34%). More than 60% of deaths, about 6.1 million, in 2016 were due to NCDs, up from about 38% in 1990. Increases in refugee urbanization, has led to a growing number of people diagnosed with chronic non-communicable diseases.

In September 2011, the United Nations is hosting its first General Assembly Special Summit on the issue of non-communicable diseases. Noting that non-communicable diseases are the cause of some 35 million deaths each year, the international community is being increasingly called to take measures for the prevention and control of chronic diseases and mitigate their impacts on the world population, especially on women, who are usually the primary caregivers.

For example, the rate of type 2 diabetes, associated with obesity, has been on the rise in countries previously troubled by hunger. In low-income countries, the number of individuals with diabetes is expected to increase from 84 million to 228 million by 2030. Obesity, a preventable condition, is associated with numerous chronic diseases, including cardiovascular conditions, stroke, certain cancers, and respiratory disease. About 16% of the global burden of disease, measured as DALYs, has been accounted for by obesity.

Lifestyle diseases

Commercial determinants of health refers private sector activities that affect people's health positively or negatively such as advertisements for unhealthy food.

Health-related largest causes of death

Violence against women 

Violence against women has been defined as: "physical, sexual and psychological violence occurring in the family and in the general community, including battering, sexual abuse, dowry-related violence, rape, female genital mutilation and other traditional practices harmful to women, non-spousal violence and violence related to exploitation, sexual harassment and intimidation at work, in educational institutions and elsewhere, trafficking in women, forced prostitution and violence perpetrated or condoned by the state." In addition to causing injury, violence may increase "women's long-term risk of a number of other health problems, including chronic pain, physical disability, drug and alcohol abuse, and depression". The WHO Report on global and regional estimates on violence against women found that partner abuse causes women to have 16% more chances of suffering miscarriages, 41% more occurrences of pre-term birth babies and twice the likeliness of having abortions and acquiring HIV or other STDs

Although statistics can be difficult to obtain as many cases go unreported, it is estimated that one in every five women faces some form of violence during her lifetime, in some cases leading to serious injury or even death. Risk factors for being an offender include low education, past exposure to child maltreatment or witnessing violence between parents, harmful use of alcohol, attitudes accepting of violence, and gender inequality. Equality of women has been addressed in the Millennium development goals. Now, Gender Equality is Sustainable Development Goal 5. Preventing the violence against women needs to form an essential part of the public health reforms in the form of advocation and evidence gathering. Primary prevention in the form of raising women economic empowerment facilities, microfinance and skills training social projects related to gender equality should be conducted.

Activities promoting relationship and communication skills among couples, reducing alcohol access and altering societal ideologies should be organized. Childhood interventions, community and school-based education, raising media-oriented awareness and other approaches should be carried out to challenge social norms and stereotypical thought processes to promote behavioral change among men and raise gender equality. Trained health care providers would play a vital role in secondary and tertiary prevention of abuse by performing early identification of women suffering from violence and contributing to the addressing of their health and psychological needs. They could be highly important in prevention of the recurrence of violence and the mitigation of its effects on the health of the abused women and their children.
The Member States of the World Health Assembly endorsed a plan in 2016 for reinforcing the health system's role in addressing the global phenomenon of violence against women and girls and working towards their health and protection.

Global surgery
Halfdan T. Mahler, the 3rd Director-General of the World Health Organization (WHO), first brought attention to the disparities in surgery and surgical care when he stated, "‘the vast majority of the world’s population has no access whatsoever to skilled surgical care and little is being done to find a solution,".

While significant progresses have been made in fields within global health such as infectious diseases, maternal and child health, and even other non-communicable diseases over the past several decades, the provision of surgery and surgical care in resource-limited settings have largely remained unmet with about 5 billion people lacking access to safe and affordable surgical and anesthesia care. This is especially true in the poorest countries, which account for over one-third of the population but only 3.5% of all surgeries that occur worldwide. In fact, it has been estimated that up to 30% of the total global burden of disease (GBD) could be attributable to surgical conditions, which include a mix of injuries, malignancies, congenital anomalies, and complications of pregnancy.  As a result, global surgery has become an emerging field within global health as 'the multidisciplinary enterprise of providing improved and equitable surgical care to the world's population, with its core belief as the issues of need, access and quality' and has often been described as the 'neglected stepchild of global health,' a term coined by Dr. Paul Farmer to highlight the urgent need for further work in this area. Furthermore, Jim Young Kim, the former President of the World Bank, proclaimed in 2014 that “surgery is an indivisible, indispensable part of health care and of progress towards universal health coverage."

In 2015, the Lancet Commission on Global Surgery (LCoGS) published the landmark report titled "Global Surgery 2030: evidence and solutions for achieving health, welfare, and economic development," describing the large, pre-existing burden of surgical diseases in low- and middle-income countries (LMICs) and future directions for increasing universal access to safe surgery by the year 2030. The Commission highlighted that 143 million additional procedures were needed every year to prevent further morbidity and mortality from treatable surgical conditions as well as a $12.3 trillion loss in economic productivity by the year 2030. It emphasized the need to significantly improve the capacity for Bellwether procedures – laparotomy, caesarean section, open fracture care – which are considered a minimum level of care that first-level hospitals should be able to provide in order to capture the most basic emergency surgical care. In order to address these challenges and track progress, the Commission defined the following core indicators for assessing access to safe and affordable surgical d anesthesia care:

Meeting these goals by the year 2030 would require increases in anesthetists, obstetricians, surgeons, nurses, and facilities with operating rooms as well as pre- and post-surgical care capacities.

Data from WHO and the World Bank indicate that scaling up infrastructure to enable access to surgical care in regions where it is currently limited or is non-existent is a low-cost measure relative to the significant morbidity and mortality caused by lack of surgical treatment. In fact, a systematic review found that the cost-effectiveness ratio – dollars spent per DALYs averted – for surgical interventions is on par or exceeds those of major public health interventions such as oral rehydration therapy, breastfeeding promotion, and even HIV/AIDS antiretroviral therapy. This finding challenged the common misconception that surgical care is financially prohibitive endeavor not worth pursuing in LMICs.

In terms of the financial impact on the patients, the lack of adequate surgical and anesthesia care has resulted in 33 million individuals every year facing catastrophic health expenditure – the out-of-pocket healthcare cost exceeding 40% of a given household's income.

In alignment with the LCoGS call for action, the World Health Assembly adopted the resolution WHA68.15 in 2015 that stated, "Strengthening emergency and essential surgical care and anesthesia as a component of universal health coverage." This not only mandated the WHO to prioritize strengthening the surgical and anesthesia care globally, but also led to governments of the member states recognizing the urgent need for increasing capacity in surgery and anesthesia. Additionally, the third edition of Disease Control Priorities (DCP3), published in 2015 by the World Bank, declared surgery as essential and featured an entire volume dedicated to building surgical capacity.

A key policy framework that arose from this renewed global commitment towards surgical care worldwide is the National Surgical Obstetric and Anesthesia Plan (NSOAP). NSOAP focuses on policy-to-action capacity building for surgical care with tangible steps as follows: (1) analysis of baseline indicators, (2) partnership with local champions, (3) broad stakeholder engagement, (4) consensus building and synthesis of ideas, (5) language refinement, (6) costing, (7) dissemination, and (8) implementation. This approach has been widely adopted and has served as guiding principles between international collaborators and local institutions and governments. Successful implementations have allowed for sustainability in terms of longterm monitoring, quality improvement, and continued political and financial support.

The NIHR Global Health Research Unit on Global Surgery
Seven surgical research Hubs in Benin, Ghana, India, Mexico, Nigeria, Rwanda and South Africa with an extensive network of urban and rural ‘Spoke’ hospitals have joined to create the NIHR. The NIHR Global Health Research Unit on Global Surgery is led by the University of Birmingham which provides overall oversight in relation to the Unit strategy, infrastructure and delivery, research and finance.

The network prioritized surgical topics that needed research and has performed multiple surgical studies. The network resulted in many research groups including GlobalSurg I, II, III and COVIDSurg and many other trials with worldwide collaborations as project FALCON and CHEETAH. 

The research was published in over 40 articles in high impact journals in topics like Surgical site infections, COVID-19 and mortality.

Other Global Surgery Collaborations
More trials have emerged to assess surgical outcomes around the World using big data from thousands of centers. Other notable trials include:

 Global PaedSurg; The study was published in The Lancet examined the risk of mortality for nearly 4000 babies born with birth defects in 264 hospitals around the world. The study found babies born with birth defects involving the intestinal tract have a two in five chance of dying in a low-income country compared to one in five in a middle-income country and one in twenty in a high-income country.
 APORG:  The African Perioperative Research Group (APORG) was launched in South Africa
 ASOS and ASOS-2; The studies showed that death after surgery is a major public health problem in Africa. Surgical patients in Africa are twice as likely to die in hospital following surgery when compared to the global average.
 ACCCOS 
 Global Health Research Group on Children’s Non-Communicable Diseases Collaborative

Many scholars from around the world have participated in overlapping trials whether as Principal Investigators, Dissemination Committee or Regional leaders to promote the research and oversee data collection. Notable collaborators from these networks include The list included key figures from around the World as Prof Bruce Biccard (South Africa), Prof Adesoji Ademuyiwa (Nigeria), Prof Kokila Lakhoo (Oxford, UK), Dr Naomi Wright (Oxford, UK), Dr Emrah Aydin (Turkey), Prof Mahmoud Elfiky (Egypt) and Prof Milind Chitnis (South Africa).

Multimorbidity, age-related diseases and aging
Multimorbidity is "a growing public health problem worldwide", "likely driven by the ageing population but also by factors such as high body-mass index, urbanisation, and the growing burden of NCDs (such as type 2 diabetes) and tuberculosis in low- and middle-income countries (LMICs)". Around the world, many people do not die from one isolated condition but from a multitude of factors and conditions. A study suggested there is a paucity of multimorbidity and comorbidity data globally and mapped comorbidity patterns. 

With aging populations, there is a rise of age-related diseases which puts major burdens on healthcare systems as well as contemporary economies or contemporary economics and their appendant societal systems. Healthspan extension and anti-aging research seek to extend the span of health in the old as well as slow aging or its negative impacts such as physical and mental decline. Modern anti-senescent and regenerative technology with augmented decision making could help "responsibly bridge the healthspan-lifespan gap for a future of equitable global wellbeing". Aging is "the most prevalent risk factor for chronic disease, frailty and disability, and it is estimated that there will be over 2 billion persons age > 60 by the year 2050", making it a large global health challenge that demands substantial (and well-orchestrated or efficient) efforts, including interventions that alter and target the inborn aging process.

Infertility crisis

A scientific review found that human sperm counts fell by 62% in the last 50 years, are decreasing at an accelerating rate and are decreasing worldwide, likely a result of factors such as poor diets, endocrine disruptors in prevalent products, unhealthy lifestyles and toxic forever chemicals in air and water.

Health interventions

Global interventions for improved child health and survival include the promotion of breastfeeding, zinc supplementation, vitamin A fortification, salt iodization, hygiene interventions such as hand-washing, vaccinations, and treatments of severe acute malnutrition. The Global Health Council suggests a list of 32 treatments and health interventions that could potentially save several million lives each year.

Many populations face an "outcome gap", which refers to the gap between members of a population who have access to medical treatment versus those who do not. Countries facing outcome gaps lack sustainable infrastructure. In Guatemala, a subset of the public sector, the Programa de Accessibilidad a los Medicamentos ("Program for Access to Medicines"), had the lowest average availability (25%) compared to the private sector (35%). In the private sector, highest- and lowest-priced medicines were 22.7 and 10.7 times more expensive than international reference prices respectively. Treatments were generally unaffordable, costing as much as 15 days wages for a course of the antibiotic ceftriaxone. The public sector in Pakistan, while having access to medicines at a lower price than international reference prices, has a chronic shortage of and lack of access to basic medicines.

Journalist Laurie Garrett argues that the field of global health is not plagued by a lack of funds, but that more funds do not always translate into positive outcomes. The problem lies in the way these funds are allocated, as they are often disproportionately allocated to alleviating a single disease.

Labor shortages
In its 2006 World Health Report, the WHO estimated a shortage of almost 4.3 million doctors, midwives, nurses, and support workers worldwide, especially in sub-Saharan Africa. A 2022 study estimated that, "in 2019, the world had 104.0 million (95% uncertainty interval 83.5–128.0) health workers, including 12.8 million (9.7–16.6) physicians, 29.8 million (23.3–37.7) nurses and midwives, 4.6 million (3.6–6.0) dentistry personnel, and 5.2 million (4.0–6.7) pharmaceutical personnel" and found that sub-Saharan Africa, south Asia, and north Africa and the Middle East had the lowest densities of human resources for health. However, even when only considering current technologies and processes (such as only little use of telehealth as of 2022), overall numbers of personnel and shortages don't consider sub-national geographic distribution of various types of health workers (or expertise).

Global health security 
The COVID-19 pandemic has highlighted how global health security is reliant on all countries around the world, including low- and middle-income countries, having strong health systems and at least a minimum of health research capacities. In an article 2020 in Annals of Global Health, the ESSENCE group outlined a mechanism for review of investment in health research capacity building in low- and middle-income countries. The review mechanism will give funders of research for health the information to identify the gaps in capacity that exist in low- and middle-income countries and the opportunity to work together to address those disparities. The overall goal is increased, coordinated support of research on national health priorities as well as improved pandemic preparedness in LMICs, and, eventually, fewer countries with very limited health research capacity.

Global factors impacting health

Climate change 
 A comprehensive annually scheduled study finds climate change is "undermining every dimension of global health monitored" and reports dire conclusions from tracking of impact indicators.

Antimicrobial resistance 
 AMR has been described as a leading global health issue. Globally, 1.27 million deaths in 2019 were attributable to AMR. That year, AMR may have contributed to 5 million deaths and one in five people who died due to AMR were children under five years old.

Organization 
Governmental or inter-governmental organizations focused on global health include:
 The United Nations
 World Health Organization
 International Agency for Research on Cancer (IARC)
 WHO Centre for Health Development (WKC)
 United Nations Children's Fund (UNICEF)
 World Food Programme (WFP)
 Pan American Health Organization (PAHO)
 International Committee of the Red Cross
 Centers for Disease Control and Prevention (CDC)
 The Global Fund to Fight AIDS, Tuberculosis and Malaria

Non-governmental organizations focused on global health include:
 Médecins Sans Frontières (Doctors Without Borders, MSF)
 Bill & Melinda Gates Foundation

Governments and analysis
A study of select global health related organizations and initiatives suggests that major trends in global health governance appear to be "towards more discretionary funding and away from core or longer-term funding; towards defined multi-stakeholder governance and away from traditional government-centred representation and decision-making; and towards narrower mandates or problem-focused vertical initiatives and away from broader systemic goals." There is a growing willingness to use militaries in state-led support of global health efforts which have capabilities ranging from "research, surveillance, and medical expertise to rapidly deployable, large-scale assets for logistics, transportation, and security".

Global Health Security Agenda 
The Global Health Security Agenda (GHSA) is "a multilateral, multi-sector effort that includes 60 participating countries and numerous private and public international organizations focused on building up worldwide health security capabilities toward meeting such threats" as the spread of infectious disease. On March 26–28, 2018, the GHSA held a high-level meeting in Tbilisi, Georgia, on biosurveillance of infectious disease threats, "which include such modern-day examples as HIV/AIDS, severe acute respiratory syndrome (SARS), H1N1 influenza, multi-drug resistant tuberculosis — any emerging or reemerging disease that threatens human health and global economic stability." This event brought together GHSA partner countries, contributing countries of Real-Time Surveillance Action Package, and international partner organizations supporting the strengthening of capacities to detect infectious disease threats within the Real-Time Surveillance Action Package and other cross-cutting packages.

GHSA works through four main mechanisms of member action, action packages, task forces and international cooperation. In 2015, the Steering Group of the GHSA agreed upon the implementation of their commitments through 11 Action Packages. Action Packages are a commitment by member countries and their partners to work collaboratively towards development and implementation of International Health Regulations (IHR). Action packages are based on GHSA's aim to strengthen national and international capacity to prevent, detect, and respond to infectious disease threats. Each action package consists of five-year targets, measures of progress, desired impacts, country commitments, and list of baseline assessments. The Joint External Evaluation process, derived as part of the IHR Monitoring and Evaluation Framework is an assessment of a country's capacity for responding to public health threats. So far, G7 partners and EU have made a collective commitment to assist 76 countries whereas the US committed to helping 32 countries to achieve GHSA targets for IHR implementation. In September 2014, a pilot tool was developed to measure progress of the Action Packages and applied in countries (Georgia, Peru, Uganda, Portugal, the United Kingdom, and Ukraine) that volunteered to participate in an external assessment.

See also 

 Global Strategy for Women's and Children's Health
 Health system
 Health economics
 Life extension#Societal strategies
 Planetary health
 Public health
 Social determinants of health
 Universal health care
 Migrant health
 Child health and nutrition in Africa
 CAB Direct – Global Health database
 Global neurosurgery

References

Further reading

External links 
GlobalHealth.gov (hosted by U.S. Department of Health & Human Services)
Partnership for Maternal, Newborn and Child Health
Roll Back Malaria – global partnership against malaria
Stop TB – global partnership against tuberculosis

 
Global issues

ja:グローバル・ヘルス